The SJFA West Region League One (also known as the McBookie.com West Region League One for sponsorship reasons) was a Scottish semi-professional football competition run by the West Region of the Scottish Junior Football Association and was the third tier of league competition for its member clubs. 

The league began in 2018, when West Region clubs voted in 2017 to organise all leagues on a regionwide basis and as a result the third tier leagues Ayrshire District League and Central District League First Division merged to form a sixteen team League One. Clubs were promoted to a rebranded Championship and relegated to a regionwide League Two.

The competition was abolished in 2020 when all SJFA West Region clubs moved to join the newly-formed senior West of Scotland Football League.

Final member clubs for the 2019–20 season

Season summaries

References

2
2018 establishments in Scotland
Sports leagues established in 2018
2020 disestablishments in Scotland
Sports leagues disestablished in 2020
Defunct football leagues in Scotland
Defunct Scottish Junior Football Association leagues